Miconia is a genus of flowering plants in the glory bush family, Melastomataceae, native to warm temperate to tropical regions of the Americas. The species are mostly shrubs and small to medium-sized trees up to 15 m tall. The generic name honours Catalan physician and botanist Francesc Micó. Some species are known by the common name johnnyberry.

Many species are threatened by habitat destruction in their native range, and some are feared to be on the brink of extinction. On the other hand, M. calvescens is a contributing factor in the decline and maybe even extinction of other plants: it has become a highly invasive weed on a number of Pacific Islands where it was introduced, including Hawaii and Tahiti. It is often referred to as the "purple plague" or the "green cancer" in reference to its habit of overgrowing native ecosystems, and its leaves which are bright green above and bright purple below.

Miconia fruit are a favorite food of many birds (invasive M. calvescens spreads by this route). The leaves of some species are eaten by caterpillars of the moth-butterflies (Hedylidae).

Species

As of 2020, genus Miconia comprised over 1200 species with new species occasionally being discovered, among them are:

 Miconia abbreviata
 Miconia acuminata
 Miconia acutifolia
 Miconia aequatorialis
 Miconia albicans 
 Miconia aligera
 Miconia alpina
 Miconia altissima 
 Miconia argyrea 
 Miconia ascendens
 Miconia asplundii
 Miconia aspratilis
 Miconia augustii
 Miconia ayacuchensis
 Miconia bailloniana
 Miconia barbipilis
 Miconia barclayana
 Miconia beneolens
 Miconia benoistii
 Miconia bipatrialis
 Miconia bolivarensis
 Miconia bracteolata 
 Miconia brasiliensis 
 Miconia brevistylis
 Miconia brevitheca
 Miconia brunnea 
 Miconia budlejoides 
 Miconia caelata
 Miconia caesariata
 Miconia cabucu
 Miconia cajanumana
 Miconia calignosa
 Miconia calophylla
 Miconia calvescens 
 Miconia campii
 Miconia candolleana 
 Miconia capitellata
 Miconia castillensis
 Miconia castrensis
 Miconia cava
 Miconia centrosperma
 Miconia ceramicarpa 
 Miconia cercophora
 Miconia chamissois 
 Miconia chartacea
 Miconia ciliata
 Miconia cinerascens 
 Miconia cinnamomifolia 
 Miconia collayensis
 Miconia conformis
 Miconia corazonica
 Miconia cosangensis
 Miconia crebribullata
 Miconia crenata
 Miconia cuprea
 Miconia cutucuensis
 Miconia dapsiliflora
 Miconia demissifolia
 Miconia depauperata 
 Miconia dichroa 
 Miconia dielsii
 Miconia dissimulans
 Miconia divaricata 
 Miconia dodsonii
 Miconia doriana 
 Miconia espinosae
 Miconia explicita
 Miconia fallax 
 Miconia fasciculata 
 Miconia floccosa
 Miconia florbella
 Miconia formosa
 Miconia fosbergii
 Miconia fuliginosa
 Miconia gibba
 Miconia gilva
 Miconia glandulistyla
 Miconia glazioviana 
 Miconia glyptophylla
 Miconia gonioclada
 Miconia grayana
 Miconia griffisii
 Miconia guayaquilensis
 Miconia hexamera
 Miconia hirsutivena
 Miconia holosericea 
 Miconia huigrensis
 Miconia hylophila
 Miconia idiogena
 Miconia imitans
 Miconia inanis
 Miconia innata
 Miconia jorgensenii
 Miconia jucunda
 Miconia lacera
 Miconia lachnoclada
 Miconia langsdorffii 
 Miconia latecrenata 
 Miconia laxa
 Miconia leandroides
 Miconia ledifolia
 Miconia ligustroides 
 Miconia littlei
 Miconia longicuspis 
 Miconia longidentata
 Miconia longisetosa
 Miconia lugonis
 Miconia macbrydeana
 Miconia macrothyrsa 
 Miconia mediocris
 Miconia medusa
 Miconia minutiflora 
 Miconia molesta
 Miconia namandensis
 Miconia nasella
 Miconia nervosa
 Miconia nubicola
 Miconia ochroleuca
 Miconia octopetala
 Miconia oellgaardii
 Miconia oligantha
 Miconia ombrophila
 Miconia onaensis
 Miconia organensis 
 Miconia ovalifolia 
 Miconia pailasana
 Miconia paniculata 
 Miconia papillosa
 Miconia pastazana
 Miconia paulensis 
 Miconia pausana
 Miconia penduliflora 
 Miconia penningtonii
 Miconia pepericarpa 
 Miconia perelegans
 Miconia pernettifolia
 Miconia phaeochaeta
 Miconia pilaloensis
 Miconia pisinniflora
 Miconia poecilantha
 Miconia pohliana 
 Miconia poortmannii
 Miconia prasina 
 Miconia prietoi
 Miconia prominens
 Miconia protuberans
 Miconia pseudo-eichlerii 
 Miconia pseudorigida
 Miconia pusilliflora 
 Miconia rabenii 
 Miconia reburrosa
 Miconia renneri
 Miconia rheophytica
 Miconia rimbachii
 Miconia rivetii
 Miconia rubiginosa 
 Miconia salicifolia 
 Miconia santaritensis
 Miconia scabra
 Miconia scutata
 Miconia saldanhaei
 Miconia sellowiana 
 Miconia serrulata 
 Miconia seticaulis
 Miconia setulosa
 Miconia silicicola
 Miconia sintenisii 
 Miconia sodiroi
 Miconia sparrei
 Miconia staminea 
 Miconia stenophylla
 Miconia stenostachya 
 Miconia suborbicularis
 Miconia subvernicosa 
 Miconia superba
 Miconia tephrodes
 Miconia theaezans
 Miconia tomentosa
 Miconia tristis 
 Miconia urophylla 
 Miconia valenzuelana
 Miconia vesca
 Miconia villonacensis
 Miconia willdenowii 
 Miconia zamorensis

References

External links

 
Melastomataceae genera
Neotropical realm flora